Silvia Danekova (Bulgarian: Силвия Дънекова; born 7 February 1983 in Kotel) is a Bulgarian athlete.

Career
She competed in the 3000 metres steeplechase at the 2012 Summer Olympics, placing 38th with a time of 9:59.52.

Danekova was scheduled to compete in the 2016 Summer Olympics but was provisionally suspended after a failed A-sample test given a few days after her arrival in Brazil. Her doping violation was later confirmed and she was handed a 4-year ban set to end on 12 August 2020.

Competition record

Personal bests
Outdoor
3000 metres steeplechase – 9:35.66 (Moscow 2013)
Half marathon – 1:15:02 (Albi 2005)
Marathon – 2:52:27 (Sofia 2013)
Indoor
1500 metres – 4:16.04 (Istanbul 2015)

References

1983 births
Living people
Bulgarian female steeplechase runners
Olympic athletes of Bulgaria
Athletes (track and field) at the 2012 Summer Olympics
Athletes (track and field) at the 2016 Summer Olympics
People from Kotel, Bulgaria
World Athletics Championships athletes for Bulgaria
Doping cases in athletics
Bulgarian sportspeople in doping cases
21st-century Bulgarian women
20th-century Bulgarian women